Marion L. Longstaff (March 11, 1904 – February 29, 1984) was an American politician from Maine. A Republican, Longstaff represented Crystal, Aroostook County, Maine in the Maine House of Representatives from 1943 to 1950 (91st-94th Legislatures).  During the 94th Legislature, Longstaff was one of three women elected to the House of Representatives. Marguerite R. Fay and Lucia M. Cormier were the others.

References

1904 births
1984 deaths
Women state legislators in Maine
People from Aroostook County, Maine
Republican Party members of the Maine House of Representatives
20th-century American politicians
20th-century American women politicians